Gry Larsen (born 7 November 1975) is the National Director for CARE Norway, and a former Norwegian politician for the Labour Party.

From 2002 to 2006 she was the leader of the Workers' Youth League, the youth wing of the Labour Party.

She served as a deputy representative to the Norwegian Parliament from Oppland during the terms 1997–2001 and 2005–2009. When the second cabinet Stoltenberg assumed office, Larsen was appointed political advisor in the Ministry of Foreign Affairs. In April 2009, she was appointed state secretary of the Ministry and held the position to 2013.

References

1975 births
Living people
Labour Party (Norway) politicians
Deputy members of the Storting
Oppland politicians
Norwegian state secretaries
Women members of the Storting
Norwegian women state secretaries